Aidan Davitt (born 13 October 1978) is an Irish Fianna Fáil politician who has served as a Senator for the Industrial and Commercial Panel since April 2016.

He was a member of Westmeath County Council from 2009 to 2016. He is the Fianna Fáil Seanad Spokesperson on Enterprise, Jobs and Innovation.

Following his involvement in the Oireachtas Golf Society Scandal ("Golfgate") in August 2020, Davitt was one of six senators who lost the party whip in the Seanad as punishment for their actions.

References

External links

Aidan Davitt's page on the Fianna Fáil website

Living people
Fianna Fáil senators
Members of the 25th Seanad
Members of the 26th Seanad
Place of birth missing (living people)
1977 births
Local councillors in County Westmeath